Kondaveeti Donga is a 1990 Indian Telugu-language vigilante film directed by A. Kodandarami Reddy starring Chiranjeevi, Vijayashanti and Radha in main lead roles. Upon release on 9 April 1990, the film received positive reviews, and emerged as a Blockbuster at the box office.

Subsequently, the film was dubbed into Tamil as Thangamalai Thirudan and it was dubbed into Malayalam as Kodanadu Kallan.  The technically brilliant film was the first Telugu film to be released on a 70 mm with 6-Track Stereophonic sound. The production design by Bhaskar Raju, with background score, and music by Ilaiyaraaja received positive reviews. The film had collected a distributors share of  7.4 million on its opening weekend.

Plot
An orphan Kondaveeti Raja M.A.,L.L.B.,I.A.S. (Chiranjeevi) is raised through the support of people living in the tribal village of Kondaveedu. Upon his return from Hyderabad, he witnesses the failed legal system and the village being engulfed in political corruption, forgery, smuggling, money laundering, drug trafficking, land grabbing and alcohol abuse carried out by the local mafia and landlords (Sarabhoji (Rao Gopal Rao), Narasimham (Mohan Babu) and Khaadra (Amrish Puri)), who impose taxes on farmers. Instead of being in the system and taking the direct route as an administrator himself, he transforms into a Robin Hood for the village and indulges in swashbuckling heists of money and paddy worth several crores from the landlords while being in disguise, much to the frustration of corrupt officials. He funds the tribals into self-sustaining farmers, while providing food, irrigation, healthcare, shelter and education to the poor and transforms the village.

Cast
Chiranjeevi as Kondaveeti Raja, a man raised by the tribals. He becomes Kondaveeti Donga (like Robin Hood) to fight the evil.
Vijayashanti as Sri Lekha, an undercover police officer appointed to capture Kondaveeti Donga, who later becomes Raja's love interest.
Radha Sri Kanya, a home surgeon serving in the tribal area of Kondaveedu. She is the first person to find out the truth about Kondaveeti Donga.
Rao Gopal Rao as Sarabhoji, landlord
Mohan Babu as Narasimham, landlord
Amrish Puri as Khaadra and Yugandhar
Sarada as Sambhavi
Kaikala Satyanarayana as Das
Nagendra Babu
Prasad Babu
Brahmanandam
Allu Rama Lingaiah
Nirmalamma
Kallu Chidambaram
Chalapathi Rao
Ranganath
Srividya as Justice Sandya
Divyavani
 Master Suresh

Soundtrack
The soundtrack composed by Ilaiyaraaja was an instant chart buster. All songs remain popular to date. Except “Chamaku Cham” all songs written by Veturi.

Telugu (original soundtrack)

Reception 
Giddaluri Gopalrao of Zamin Ryot, writing his review on 23 March 1990, gave a positive review for the film. Gopalrao praised the screenplay by Yandamuri and Chiranjeevi's performance.

References

External links

1990 films
Indian action films
Indian vigilante films
Robin Hood films
Films about communism
Films about poverty in India
Fictional portrayals of the Andhra Pradesh Police
Films scored by Ilaiyaraaja
1990s Telugu-language films
Films directed by A. Kodandarami Reddy
Films about social issues in India
Films about farmers' suicides in India
Films about organised crime in India
Films about corruption in India
Indian swashbuckler films
Films about landlords
1990 action films